Charles K. Lexow (January 21, 1849 – July 14, 1928) was the Commissioner of Supreme Court Records and the oldest Republican District Leader in New York City in 1928 when he died.

Biography
He was born on January 21, 1849, to Rudolph Lexow. He had a brother, Clarence Lexow. He graduated from Columbia Law School, then was the first attorney for the Legal Aid Society in New York City. He handled 212 cases in his first year in the office, collecting a total of $1,000 for his clients. He died on July 14, 1928.

References

1849 births
1928 deaths
Columbia Law School alumni
Legal Aid Society
New York (state) Republicans